Trevor Michael Kelley (born October 20, 1993) is an American professional baseball pitcher for the Tampa Bay Rays of Major League Baseball (MLB). He has previously played in MLB for the Boston Red Sox, Philadelphia Phillies and Milwaukee Brewers.

Amateur career
Kelley attended Eugene Ashley High School in Wilmington, North Carolina. He attended the University of North Carolina and played college baseball for the Tar Heels in addition to pursuing a degree in exercise and sport science. During his freshman year of college, Kelley became a sidearm pitcher. In 2013, he played collegiate summer baseball with the Orleans Firebirds of the Cape Cod Baseball League. He was drafted by the Boston Red Sox in the 36th round of the 2015 MLB draft.

Professional career

Boston Red Sox
In 2015, Kelley played for the rookie league GCL Red Sox and the Class A Short Season Lowell Spinners, combining to go 1–3 with a 3.60 ERA in 25 innings. He split the 2016 season between the Class A Greenville Drive and the Class A-Advanced Salem Red Sox, going a combined 1–3 with a 1.83 ERA in 39 innings. He split 2017 between Salem and the Double-A Portland Sea Dogs, going a combined 2–1 with a 2.36 ERA over 60.1 innings. His 2018 season was split between Portland and the Triple-A Pawtucket Red Sox, going 2–3 with a 2.88 ERA in 56 innings.

Kelley opened the 2019 season back with Pawtucket, where through the end of June he had a 5–2 record in 28 games (all in relief) with a 0.96 ERA and 34 strikeouts in  innings. On July 1, the Red Sox announced that they would add Kelley to their active major league roster; he made his MLB debut on July 2, pitching the ninth inning in a 10–6 win over the Toronto Blue Jays. Kelley was optioned to Pawtucket on July 4. In late August, he was named to the International League post season all-star team. He was recalled to Boston on September 4, following the end of the Triple-A season. In mid-September, Kelley was named a Triple-A post season all-star by Baseball America, and was named the recipient of the Red Sox' Lou Gorman Award. Overall with the 2019 Red Sox, Kelley appeared in 10 games, compiling an 0–3 record with an 8.64 ERA and six strikeouts in  innings.

Philadelphia Phillies
On December 2, 2019, Kelley was claimed off waivers by the Philadelphia Phillies. He was designated for assignment by the Phillies on January 31, 2020, and outrighted on February 5. Kelley made the Opening Day roster for the Phillies in 2020. He was designated for assignment again by the Phillies on August 11, 2020. He elected free agency on September 28, 2020.

Chicago Cubs
On December 21, 2020, Kelley signed a minor league contract with the Chicago Cubs. On April 24, 2021, Kelley was released by the Cubs organization.

Atlanta Braves
On April 28, 2021, Kelley signed a minor league contract with the Atlanta Braves organization.
Kelley spent the 2021 season with the Triple-A Gwinnett Stripers, making 37 appearances with a 1.52 ERA and 46 strikeouts. Kelley became a free agent following the 2021 season.

Milwaukee Brewers
On November 18, 2021, Kelley signed a minor league deal with the Milwaukee Brewers, with an invite to spring training. He had his contract selected on May 17, 2022. On the year, Kelley made a career-high 18 appearances, logging a 6.08 ERA, striking out 23 in 23.2 innings of work, and collecting his first career win.

On January 4, 2023, Kelley was designated for assignment by the Brewers following the acquisition of Bryse Wilson. On January 11, Kelley cleared waivers and was assigned outright to the Triple-A Nashville Sounds. However, he rejected the outright assignment and elected free agency the same day.

Tampa Bay Rays
On January 18, 2023, Kelley signed a minor league contract with the Tampa Bay Rays organization. On February 16, Kelley was selected to the 40-man roster, but the move was voided the following day as, as a non-roster invitee, Kelley was ineligible for the 40-man until March 15. On March 15, the Rays officially selected Kelley to the 40-man roster, placing Andrew Kittredge on the 60-day injured list to clear roster space.

References

External links

Stats and analysis at SoxProspects.com
North Carolina Tar Heels bio

1993 births
Living people
People from Barrington, Rhode Island
Baseball players from Rhode Island
Major League Baseball pitchers
Boston Red Sox players
Philadelphia Phillies players
Milwaukee Brewers players
North Carolina Tar Heels baseball players
Orleans Firebirds players
Gulf Coast Red Sox players
Lowell Spinners players
Greenville Drive players
Salem Red Sox players
Portland Sea Dogs players
Pawtucket Red Sox players
Gwinnett Braves players
Gwinnett Stripers players
Nashville Sounds players